Vigneulles is a commune in the Meurthe-et-Moselle département in north-eastern France.

In the past, inhabitants of Vigneulles were known by their neighbours as poussais ("chasers"), having taken up pitchforks to chase off the villagers from Barbonville who had come to steal their supposedly miracle performing statue of the Virgin.

See also
Communes of the Meurthe-et-Moselle department

References

Communes of Meurthe-et-Moselle